is a railway station on the Fujikyuko Line in the city of Fujiyoshida, Yamanashi, Japan, operated by Fuji Kyuko (Fujikyu).

Lines

Station layout
The station is staffed and consists of one side platform serving a single bidirectional track. It has a waiting room and toilet facilities.

Adjacent stations

History
Gekkōji Station opened on 1 October 1931.

Passenger statistics
In fiscal 1998, the station was used by an average of 1,031 passengers daily.

Surrounding area
 Fujiyoshida City Office
 Gekkōji Temple (after which the station is named)
 Fuji Gakuen High School
 Yoshida High School
 Fuji Gakuen Junior High School
 Shimoyoshida Junior High School
 Shimoyoshida No. 2 Elementary School
 Gekkōji Kindergarten

See also
 List of railway stations in Japan

References

External links

 Fujikyuko station information 

Railway stations in Yamanashi Prefecture
Railway stations in Japan opened in 1931
Stations of Fuji Kyuko
Fujiyoshida